Dragon Fire is a 2000 novel by BBC political and foreign correspondent Humphrey Hawksley about a 2007 war between China, India and Pakistan, which draws in Australia, Bhutan, Myanmar, Nepal, New Zealand, Tibet, the United Kingdom, and the United States, and threatens to escalate to nuclear war.

While a work of fiction, the novel attempts to raise awareness of real geopolitical issues in the region.

Description 
This novel gives us nightmare scenarios where the world's worst fears begin on 10:00 a.m. on 3 May 2007. A SFF (Special Frontier Force) unit led by Major Gendun Choedrak assaults Drapchi prison with paratroopers to free Tibetan religious leaders who are being incarcerated there. Far out west, Pakistan launches an attack on the strategic outpost of Kargil, promptly raising the green crescent flag on Indian soil. China accuses India of attacking Chinese soil and declares war. It's Pakistan and China vs India now, 3 nuclear powers. Nuclear arsenals are being mobilized.
Later Pakistan is devastated while India and China are threatening nuclear war. Russia says whoever is involved in this matter will have to face her first. The West's greatest nightmares are becoming true.

Major themes
Significant background themes include:
 Tibet
 The Kashmiri conflict, and especially the Kargil War
 Chinese, Indian and Pakistani nuclear weapons programs
 Relationships between Taiwan and China

Critical reception
John Elliott of the New Statesman said that the novel was a "good read" and that "it is uncomfortably accurate about the dangers facing Asia".

References

External links
 Author's web site

2000 British novels
Novels by Humphrey Hawksley
British thriller novels
Military fiction
Novels set during World War III
British political novels
India–Pakistan relations in popular culture
Kashmir conflict in fiction
Novels set in Tibet
Indian Armed Forces in fiction
Military of Pakistan in fiction
Pan Books books